Cameron Cook (born 16 August 2001) is an Australian professional footballer who plays as a goalkeeper for Perth Glory. He made his professional debut in a FFA Cup playoff match against Melbourne Victory on 24 November 2021.

Perth Glory
On 7 December 2021, Cook made his A-league debut in a 3-0 win against Melbourne Victory and became the first player born in Alice Springs to play in the A-league.

References

External links

Living people
People from Alice Springs
Australian soccer players
Association football goalkeepers
Adelaide United FC players
Perth Glory FC players
National Premier Leagues players
2001 births